Giovanni Battista Pontano or Giovanni Battista Montano (died 1662) was a Roman Catholic prelate who served as Bishop of Oppido Mamertina (1632–1662).

Biography
Giovanni Battista Pontano was ordained a priest on 20 September 1608.
On 19 January 1632, he was appointed during the papacy of Pope Urban VIII as Bishop of Oppido Mamertina.
On 25 January 1632, he was consecrated bishop by Antonio Marcello Barberini, Cardinal-Priest of Sant'Onofrio, with Antonio Provana, Archbishop of Turin, and Giovanni Francesco Passionei, Bishop of Cagli, serving as co-consecrators. 
He served as Bishop of Oppido Mamertina until his death in May 1662.

References

External links and additional sources
 (for Chronology of Bishops) 
 (for Chronology of Bishops) 

17th-century Italian Roman Catholic bishops
Bishops appointed by Pope Urban VIII
1662 deaths